Troed y Rhiw (foot of the hill in English) is a hamlet in Ceredigion approximately midway between Cribyn and Dihewyd in the rolling agricultural land between Lampeter and Aberaeron. It lies between the land-holdings of Pont Marchog farm and Pen Bryn farm

In the 19th century it boasted a chapel, a shop and post office and a pub together with several cottages scattered around the road junction on which the hamlet sits. During the early 20th century the Pub disappeared and is only marked by its ruins in a small copse. The shop and post-office were lost in the early 1970s which probably marked the time of least population . Subsequent to that new development behind the old shop and on the field below Pen Bryn Farm has substantially increased the size of the settlement.

The elegant early 19th century chapel remains in occasional use.

Villages in Ceredigion